Melvin Leroy Swart (June 25, 1919 – February 27, 2007) was a Canadian politician in Ontario. He served in the Legislative Assembly of Ontario as a New Democratic MPP from 1975 to 1988.

Background
Swart was born in London, Ontario. he went to school at Smithville Secondary School, and worked as a foreman. He served as an alderman in Thorold from 1948 to 1950, and was deputy reeve from 1951 to 1954 and reeve from 1955 to 1965. He became a warden for Welland County in 1961, and was president of the Association of Ontario Mayors and Reeves in 1961-62. He later served temporarily as its part-time executive director around 1970.

Politics
Swart campaigned for the House of Commons of Canada five times, but was never successful. He was defeated in Welland as a candidate of the Cooperative Commonwealth Federation in a 1950 by-election, and in the general elections of 1953, 1957 and 1958.

He ran again for the federal New Democratic Party in the 1962 election, and was again defeated. On all five occasions, he finished third against his Progressive Conservative and Liberal opponents.

His provincial career was initially no more successful. He challenged Progressive Conservative incumbent Ellis Morningstar for the Welland provincial constituency in the 1967 election, but lost by 260 votes.  He ran again in the 1971 election, and lost by a greater margin.

He had left the municipal council to concentrate on provincial politics, and stayed out of council until 1972, when he ran for Regional Councillor of Niagara Region and was elected, elected again in 1974. He served a two-year term as president of the New Democratic Party of Ontario beginning in 1974.

Morningstar retired at the 1975 election, and Swart was able to defeat his successor, Allan Pietz, by 1,115 votes.  He defeated Pietz again for the newly created riding of Welland—Thorold in the 1977 election, and won by much greater margins in the elections of 1981, 1985 and 1987. He retired in 1988, and was replaced in the legislature by Peter Kormos, also of the NDP.

Two years after his retirement, the NDP won a majority government under Bob Rae. Despite having nominated Rae at the 1982 Ontario NDP leadership convention, Swart became highly critical of Rae's leadership in government, and blamed the Premier for falling NDP membership and financial contributions in the early 1990s.

Swart had been the leading advocate of public auto insurance in Ontario in the 1980s  and was especially critical of the Rae government's decision to go back on its promise to introduce the program. In 1994, Swart publicly called on Rae to resign as NDP leader.

Legacy
The Mel Swart Lake Gibson Conservation Area is in Thorold, Ontario. Swart was considered a political mentor to Peter Kormos who inherited both his predecessor's seat in the legislature and his strong advocacy of public auto insurance.

References

External links

1919 births
2007 deaths
Mayors of places in Ontario
New Democratic Party candidates for the Canadian House of Commons
Ontario municipal councillors
Ontario New Democratic Party MPPs
People from Thorold
Politicians from London, Ontario
Co-operative Commonwealth Federation candidates for the Canadian House of Commons